A Peter Boat or Peterboat was a type of fishing boat, found principally on the Thames Estuary and the adjacent coasts of eastern England. In legend, the peter boat's origins lie with the boats used to ferry passengers to and from St. Peter's Abbey, the Saxon predecessor to Westminster Abbey in London.

The Peter Boat Inn, in Leigh-on-Sea near the mouth of the Thames Estuary, is named after this type of fishing boat.

References

Types of fishing vessels